The Shalozersky mine is a large mine in the north-west of Russia in Republic of Karelia. Shalozersky represents one of the largest chromium reserve in Russia having estimated reserves of 206.1 million tonnes of ore grading 15.4% chromium.  The 206.1 million tonnes of ore contains 31.7 million tonnes of chromium metal.

References 

Chromium mines in Russia